= Khaneh Shahr Hall =

- تالار خانه شهر; Khāneh e Shahr
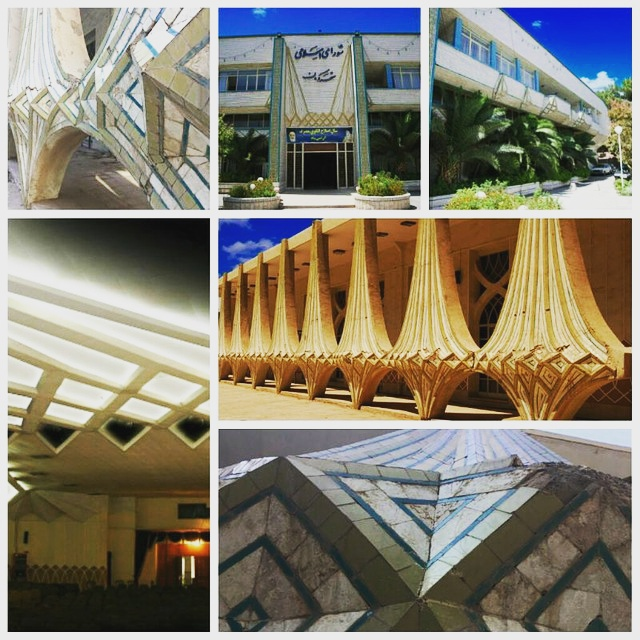

General information
- Type: Theatr & concert House, Meetings
- Location: Paramount square (Shora square), Kerman, Iran
- Construction started: December 10, 1969
- Completed: 1969
- Inaugurated: September 28, 1971

Design and construction
- Architect: Ali Asghar Esfahani

Khaneh Shahr Hall is a meeting hall in Kerman, Iran. It was built in early 1969.

== History ==
Authorities decided to construct a place to hold community and public ceremonies in early 1969. The hall was threatened with destruction in December, 2012.

== Building ==
Reception and meeting areas are available.

== See also ==
- Khaneh Shahr Hall on Farsi Wikipedia
